Carlton - Bunting is a neighbourhood in the city of St. Catharines, Ontario, Canada. The community is bordered on the west by the old rail-line that is located between Grantham Avenue and Niagara Regional Road 52, on the east by the Welland Canal and Cushman Road, on the north by Scott Street, and on the south by Welland Avenue and Meredith Drive.
This neighbourhood is composed of mainly low density residential properties.

Parks:
 Berkley Park
 Bermuda Park
 Cushman Road Park

Public Schools:
 Carleton Public School
 E.I. McCulley Public School

References

Neighbourhoods in St. Catharines